Mary O'Hara is an Irish musician.

Mary O'Hara may also refer to:
Mary O'Hara (author) (1885–1980), American author and screenwriter
Mary O'Hara (journalist), journalist, writer and anti-poverty activist
Mary O'Hara (TV series), an Australian television series featuring the musician
Mary Margaret O'Hara, Canadian singer-songwriter and actress

Ohara, Mary